Akodon boliviensis, also known as the Bolivian grass mouse or Bolivian akodont, is a species of rodent in the family Cricetidae. It is found in the Andes from southeastern Peru through Bolivia into northwestern Argentina.

References

Literature cited
Dunnum, J., Vargas, J., Bernal, N., Zeballos, H., Vivar, E., Patterson, B., Pardinas, U. and Jayat, J.P. 2008. . In IUCN. IUCN Red List of Threatened Species. Version 2009.2. <www.iucnredlist.org>. Downloaded on April 2, 2010.
Jayat, J.P., Ortiz, P.E., Salazar-Bravo, J., Pardiñas, U.F.J. and D'Elía, G. 2010. The Akodon boliviensis species group (Rodentia: Cricetidae: Sigmodontinae) in Argentina: species limits and distribution, with the description of a new entity (abstract). Zootaxa 2409:1–61.
Musser, G.G. and Carleton, M.D. 2005. Superfamily Muroidea. Pp. 894–1531 in Wilson, D.E. and Reeder, D.M. (eds.). Mammal Species of the World: a taxonomic and geographic reference. 3rd ed. Baltimore: The Johns Hopkins University Press, 2 vols., 2142 pp. 

Mammals of Bolivia
Mammals of Argentina
Mammals of Peru
Akodon
Mammals described in 1833
Taxonomy articles created by Polbot